The Chapeltown riots of 1987 took place in the Leeds district of Chapeltown in West Yorkshire, England. Widespread rioting in Chapeltown also occurred in 1975 and 1981. During the 1981 riots, rioting took place not only in Chapeltown, but also in London, Birmingham and Liverpool.
  

The riots of 1987 began Sunday, 21 June, when a black teenager, 17 year old Marcus Skellington, was arrested and beaten by police. It is estimated that 70 teenagers participated in smashing shop windows, looting and attacking police officers 22 and 21 June. On 23 June, shops, cars, and windows were burned, bombed and stoned, including a sex shop which was completely burnt down. The burning of the sex shop was particularly significant for two reasons. First, it was not widely supported or wanted by the local community and had been protested prior to the riots. Second, it was believed that the police carried out surveillance of the Hayfield Pub car park for marijuana dealing from above the sex shop, despite the sex shop operating illegally at times.

See also
2001 Harehills riot

References

External links 

 Chapeltown: One Year One. 1987. Documentary. Yorkshire Film Archives.

Chapeltown
Chapeltown race riot
Crime in Leeds
History of Leeds
Riots and civil disorder in England
Chapeltown, Leeds
1980s in Leeds
June 1987 events in the United Kingdom